Blue Gum Park is located in the Northwood community in the city of Irvine in Orange County, California. The park is located near the I-5 freeway Jeffrey Road exit.

References 

Geography of Irvine, California
Parks in Orange County, California
Municipal parks in California